Matei Machedon (born 10 February 1960 in Romania) is a Romanian-American mathematician, specializing in partial differential equations and mathematical physics.

Machedon graduated from the University of Chicago with B.A./M.S. in 1982. He received his Ph.D. from Princeton University in 1986 with thesis advisor Charles Fefferman. Machedon was a C.L.E. Moore Instructor at MIT from 1986 to 1988. At Princeton University he was an assistant professor from 1988 to 1994. He was at the Institute for Advanced Study for the academic year 1994–1995. At the University of Maryland he was an associate professor from 1994 to 1998 and is since 1998 a full professor.

Machedon held a Sloan Fellowship for the academic year 1985–1986 and for the two academic years 1989–1991. He has frequently collaborated with Sergiu Klainerman and Manoussos Grillakis. In 1998 Machedon was an invited speaker at the International Congress of Mathematicians in Berlin.

Selected publications

References

1960 births
Living people
20th-century American mathematicians
21st-century American mathematicians
20th-century Romanian mathematicians
21st-century Romanian mathematicians
University of Chicago alumni
Princeton University alumni
Princeton University faculty
University System of Maryland faculty
Sloan Research Fellows
PDE theorists
Romanian emigrants to the United States
Massachusetts Institute of Technology School of Science faculty